Native Taiwanese may refer to:

 Benshengren, Han people who settled in Taiwan prior to 1945
 Taiwanese indigenous peoples, Austronesian peoples native to Taiwan